The cartography of the region of Palestine, also known as cartography of the Holy Land and cartography of the Land of Israel, is the creation, editing, processing and printing of maps of the region of Palestine from ancient times until the rise of modern surveying techniques. For several centuries during the Middle Ages it was the most prominent subject in all of cartography, and it has been described as an "obsessive subject of map art".

The history of the mapping of Palestine is dominated by two cartographic traditions: the biblical school and the classical school. The earliest surviving maps of the biblical tradition derive from the attempts of the early Church Fathers to identify and illustrate the primary locations mentioned in the Bible, and to provide maps for Christian pilgrimage. The earliest surviving maps of the classical tradition derive from the scientific and historical works of the Greco-Roman world; the European rediscovery of Ptolemy's works in the 1400s ended the domination of the biblical tradition. Many Graeco-Roman geographers described the Palestine region in their writings; however, there are no surviving pre-modern originals or copies of these maps – illustrations today of maps according to geographers such as Hecataeus, Herodotus or Eratosthenes are modern reconstructions. The earliest surviving classical maps of the region are Byzantine versions of Ptolemy's 4th Asia map. Cartographic history of Palestine thus begins with Ptolemy, whose work was based on that of the local geographer Marinus of Tyre.

The first lists of maps of the region were made in the late 19th century, by Titus Tobler in his 1867 Geographical Bibliography of Palestine and subsequently by Reinhold Röhricht in his 1890 Geographical Library of Palestine. In a series of articles in the Journal of the German Association for the Study of Palestine between 1891 and 1895, Röhricht presented the first detailed analysis of maps of the region in the middle- and the late Middle Ages. They were followed in 1939-40 by Hans Fischer's History of the Cartography of Palestine. This article lists maps that progressed the cartography of region before the rise of modern surveying techniques, showing how mapmaking and surveying improved and helped outsiders to better understand the geography of the area. Imaginary maps and copies of existing maps are excluded.

Notable maps of Palestine

Early maps (2nd–10th centuries)

Crusader maps (12th–14th centuries)

Notable 15th–18th century maps

Notable 19th century maps

Modern cartography
 Commons:Maps of Palestine from the German Vermessungsabteilung (1918), and Gottlieb Schumacher
 Survey of Palestine (1920-48)
 Survey of Israel (1948 onwards)

Biblical / imaginary maps
John Speed map of Canaan
Nolin map

See also
 Cartography of Jerusalem
 Travelogues of Palestine

References

Bibliography

Hopkins, I. W. J. “Nineteenth-Century Maps of Palestine: Dual-Purpose Historical Evidence,” Imago Mundi, vol. 22, 1968, pp. 30–36. JSTOR,

External links

 Google Arts & Culture, Maps of the Holy Land and Jerusalem

Maps of Palestine (region)
Maps of Israel
Palestine
Cartography by country